OLinuXino is an open hardware single-board computer capable of running Android or Linux designed by OLIMEX Ltd in Bulgaria.

The project's goal was to design DIY friendly industrial-grade Linux board which everyone can reproduce at home.
It leverages widely-available hand-solderable components which are reasonable to purchase in low quantities, housed in TQFP packages.
The project's CAD files are hosted on GitHub, allowing everyone to study and customize them according to their needs.
Initially OLinuXino was designed with EAGLE.
In March 2016 the first boards designed with KiCad became available as OLIMEX Ltd announced plans on switching development to Open Source CAD tools.

iMX233

A13
The Chinese company Allwinner released in April 2012 Cortex-A8 SoC in TQFP package, this was spotted immediately by OLinuXino developers and they start working on OLinuXino board based on A13
Three OLinuXino boards with A13 processor were released:

A10S
In November 2012, Allwinner released a new A10S processor with HDMI and Ethernet and dual-core A20 processor.
The A13 has no native Ethernet capability, so the A10S processor was chosen for new OLinuXino boards.

A20

A64

Operating systems
Officially supported:
 Debian
 Android

Third party:
 Armbian
 Arch Linux ARM

See also
 List of open-source hardware projects

References

External links
 OLinuXino web site
 SUNXI: OlimexA64-OLinuXino
 OLinuXino looks to take on the Raspberry Pi
 Meet the iMX233 OLinuXino Nano
 Element14 Olimex A10S/A20-OLinuXino boards quite BBB-like
 Linux Sunxi Community Open Source Hardware
 Hackaday article - OLinuXino booting Android
 CNX-Software OLinuXino unboxing and review
 Slashdot Fully open OLinuXino computer
 PC Magazine - PC like the Raspberry Pi but faster and fully open
 Dangerous Prototypes - OLinuXino single board computer

Single-board computers